Karl Otto Kuehl (pronounced "keel"; September 5, 1937 – August 6, 2008)  was an American professional baseball player and a scout, farm system official, coach and manager in Major League Baseball.

He also was the co-author of two books on the mental approach to baseball: The Mental Game of Baseball: A Guide to Peak Performance (1989) and A Champion's State of Mind (2005).

Montreal Expos' manager (1976)
In 1976, Kuehl was named the second manager in the history of the Montreal Expos franchise, although did not complete a full season in the job. His Expos won only 43 of 128 games (.336) and were in last place in the National League East Division when Kuehl was replaced by Charlie Fox on September 4.

He was promoted to Montreal after a successful stint as skipper of the Expos' top farm team, the Memphis Blues, in 1975. Previously, he managed the Double-A Québec Carnavals in 1972–1973 before moving up to Triple-A Memphis.

Minor league career
Kuehl was born in Monterey Park, California. He played in the farm system of the Cincinnati Redlegs from 1955 through 1958, rising to the Seattle Rainiers of the Open-Classification Pacific Coast League for ten games in 1957, compiling a lifetime .306 batting average.

He began his managing career at the young age of 21 as the player manager of the unaffiliated Salem Senators of the Class B Northwest League in 1959.

He rejoined the Cincinnati system in 1961 as pilot of the Class D Geneva Redlegs of the New York–Penn League. He then worked as a scout and minor league manager for the Houston Astros and the Seattle Pilots/Milwaukee Brewers before joining the Montreal organization in 1971.

Major League coach and executive
After weathering the 1976 debacle, Kuehl remained in the Major Leagues as a coach with the Minnesota Twins under manager Gene Mauch, whom he had replaced in Montreal. He also served under Mauch's successors, Johnny Goryl and Billy Gardner, during his six years (1977–1982) with the Twins.

Kuehl then headed the player development department of the Oakland Athletics from 1983 through 1995, a period when the A's had one of the most productive farm systems in baseball. After leaving Oakland, he spent two seasons (1996–1997) in the front office of the Toronto Blue Jays. From 2001 to 2007, Kuehl was special advisor, baseball operations, for the Cleveland Indians.

He died as a result of pulmonary fibrosis on August 6, 2008, in a Scottsdale, Arizona, hospital at the age of 70.

References

External links

Managerial statistics

1937 births
2008 deaths
Baseball coaches from California
Baseball players from California
Cleveland Indians executives
Deaths from pulmonary fibrosis
Geneva Redlegs players
High Point-Thomasville Hi-Toms players
Houston Astros scouts
Major League Baseball farm directors
Major League Baseball third base coaches
Milwaukee Brewers scouts
Minnesota Twins coaches
Minor league baseball managers
Montreal Expos managers
Montreal Expos scouts
Oakland Athletics executives
Oakland Athletics scouts
Ogden Reds players
Salem Senators players
Savannah Redlegs players
Seattle Pilots scouts
Seattle Rainiers players
Sportspeople from Los Angeles County, California
Toronto Blue Jays executives